Stăuini may refer to several villages in Romania:

 Stăuini, a village in Vințu de Jos Commune, Alba County
 Stăuini, a village in Balșa Commune, Hunedoara County